Chandra Singhal (died in 1980) was a member of Aligarh (Lok Sabha constituency) in 1952. He was Agrawal Vaishya.

References 

Politicians from Aligarh
Year of birth missing
1980 deaths
Lok Sabha members from Uttar Pradesh
India MPs 1952–1957
Indian National Congress politicians from Uttar Pradesh